St Mary Magdalen is a Church of England parish church in Magdalen Street, Oxford, England, dedicated to Jesus' companion Mary Magdalene. It is one of the city's ancient parish churches and is a Grade I listed building.

Worship
Worship at St Mary Magdalen's is high church Anglo-Catholic. Mass is celebrated 15 times a week: twice daily on weekdays, and three times on Sundays. The main celebration is at 10:30 am on Sunday mornings.

History
A Saxon wooden church was built outside the Saxon walls of the city of Oxford, just beyond the North Gate. This church was burnt down in 1074, so Robert D'Oyly, the Norman Constable of Oxford, had single-aisle chapel built to replace it.

In 1194 Saint Hugh, Bishop of Lincoln, had the church rebuilt. Work of that period survives in the east wall of the chancel wall and in the south aisle, and the altar dedicated to St Thomas Becket. By 1235 the church had an altar dedicated to the Virgin Mary. The chancel was rebuilt late in the 13th century. A century later the scholars of newly founded Balliol College had an oratory dedicated to St Catherine in the present north aisle. In 1320 the Carmelites founded a chapel in the south aisle, which survives as the present Lady Chapel.

The west tower was built between 1511 and 1531. The south porch, with a room above it, was also added around this time.

In 1841–42 the church was restored. The architects for the north or "Martyrs' Aisle" were George Gilbert Scott, then young and unknown, and his partner W. B. Moffatt. Scott and Moffatt also had the Norman arch to the chancel removed. The north aisle complemented Scott's Martyrs' Memorial just north of the church. It was the first Gothic Revival interior in Oxford.

The architect for the restoration of the south aisle was Edward Blore.

In 1874–75 the 13th-century chancel was altered by raising the floor before the altar and adding a screen, the windows of the west tower were opened into the church and the bells were re-hung. The architect for these works was William Wilkinson.

The antiquary and biographer John Aubrey was buried in the churchyard.

Bells

The west tower has a ring of 10 bells, all cast or re-cast by John Taylor & Co of Loughborough. The tenor bell was re-cast in 1988. The fifth, sixth, seventh, eighth and ninth bells were re-cast in 1990. The third and fourth bells were cast in 2000. There were eight bells in the ring until 2001, when John Taylor & Co cast and hung the present treble and second bell.

The Oxford University Society of Change Ringers has rung the bells since the 1930s.

See also
 Oxford University Society of Change Ringers
 St Michael at the Northgate, to the south
 St Giles' Church, to the north

References

Bibliography

External links
 St Mary Magdalen Oxford

12th-century church buildings in England
Anglo-Catholic church buildings in Oxfordshire
Mary Magdalen
Edward Blore buildings
George Gilbert Scott buildings
Mary Magdalen
Grade I listed churches in Oxfordshire
Churches completed in 1194